The men's pommel horse competition was one of eight events for male competitors in artistic gymnastics at the 1956 Summer Olympics in Melbourne. It was held from 3 to 7 December at the Melbourne Festival Hall. There were 63 competitors from 18 nations (down sharply from the 185 gymnasts in 1952), with nations in the team competition having up to 6 gymnasts and other nations entering up to 3 gymnasts. The event was won by Boris Shakhlin of the Soviet Union, the nation's second consecutive victory in the pommel horse. Takashi Ono earned Japan's first medal in the event with his silver. Soviet Viktor Chukarin became the first man to win multiple medals in the pommel horse, adding a bronze to his 1952 gold.

Background

This was the ninth appearance of the event, which is one of the five apparatus events held every time there were apparatus events at the Summer Olympics (no apparatus events were held in 1900, 1908, 1912, or 1920). Two of the top 10 gymnasts from 1952 returned: gold medalist Viktor Chukarin of the Soviet Union and sixth-place finisher Hans Sauter of Austria. Reigning world champion and Olympic silver medalist Hrant Shahinyan of the Soviet Union did not compete; Chukarin at third place in the worlds was the highest placed gymnast to come to Melbourne.

Australia and Canada each made their debut in the men's pommel horse; East and West Germany competed together as the United Team of Germany for the first time. The United States made its eighth appearance, most of any nation, having missed only the inaugural 1896 Games.

Competition format

The gymnastics format continued to use the aggregation format, mostly following the scoring tweaks made in 1952. Each nation entered either a team of six gymnasts or up to three individual gymnasts. All entrants in the gymnastics competitions performed both a compulsory exercise and a voluntary exercise for each apparatus. The 2 exercise scores were summed to give an apparatus total. No separate finals were contested.

Exercise scores ranged from 0 to 10 and apparatus scores from 0 to 20.

Schedule

All times are Australian Eastern Standard Time (UTC+10)

Results

References

Official Olympic Report
www.gymnasticsresults.com
www.gymn-forum.net

Men's pommel horse
Men's 1956
Men's events at the 1956 Summer Olympics